The indoor women's singles competition at the 1912 Summer Olympics was part of the tennis program for the games.

Draw

Draw

References
 
 
  ITF, 2008 Olympic Tennis Event Media Guide

Women's indoor singles
1912 in women's tennis
Tenn